Albert Downs (26 September 1905 – 7 October 1985) was an Australian rules footballer who played for the Collingwood Football Club in the Victorian Football League (VFL).

Notes

External links 
		
Albert Downs's profile at Collingwood Forever

1905 births
1985 deaths
Australian rules footballers from Victoria (Australia)
Collingwood Football Club players